Juro Tkalčić (13 February 1877 – 15 December 1957) was a Croatian cellist and composer.

References

External links
 
 

1877 births
1957 deaths
Croatian classical cellists
Croatian classical composers
Male classical composers
Musicians from Zagreb
19th-century classical composers
20th-century classical composers
19th-century Croatian people
20th-century Croatian people
20th-century male musicians
19th-century male musicians
20th-century cellists
Yugoslav composers